A special election was held in  on May 4, 1808, to fill a vacancy left by the death of Jacob Crowninshield (DR) on April 15, 1808.

Election results

Story ran unopposed and took his seat on December 20, 1808

See also
List of special elections to the United States House of Representatives

References

United States House of Representatives 1808 02
Massachusetts 1808 02
Massachusetts 1808 02
1808 02
Massachusetts 02
1808 Massachusetts elections
Single-candidate elections